Fast-Walking is a 1982 American prison drama film directed, produced, and written by James B. Harris, based on Ernest Brawley's 1974 novel The Rap. The film stars James Woods, Tim McIntire, Kay Lenz, Robert Hooks, and M. Emmet Walsh.

Plot
Frank Miniver, aka Fast-Walking, is a corrupt but lovable Oregon state prison guard. Not the most obliging or honest of public servants, he smokes and peddles marijuana and complements his meager salary by running prostitutes for Mexican laborers out of his cousin Evie's convenience store.

At work, he is in close contact with his other cousin Wasco, who is incarcerated. Wasco is involved in vice operations within the prison and outside of it. He peddles women, narcotics, and is looking to get into fraudulent banking operations. He bullies a competitor called Bullet into turning over his in-prison operations to Wasco.

An accomplice to Wasco on the outside is an attractive young woman called Moke. She carries on his bidding, which means even seducing Fast-Walking with sex. A black political prisoner named Galliot soon arrives at the prison and Wasco plots to have him killed in the racially tense environment. Fast-Walking arranges to have Galliot sprung from prison. Galliot offers him $50,000 and a secret key hidden in his belt buckle that is to a safe-deposit box.

Wasco eventually learns about Fast-Walking and Moke having an intense sexual relationship and becomes jealous. So he launches a scheme to have Moke kill Galliot, which she does with a high-powered rifle as he nearly gets away dressed as a prison guard. But Fast-Walking soon teaches him that what goes around, comes around.

Cast
 James Woods as Frank "Fast-Walking" Miniver
 Tim McIntire as 	Wasco (Frank's cousin)
 Kay Lenz as 	Moke (Wasco's girlfriend)
 Robert Hooks as 	William Galliot
 Charles Weldon as 	Officer Jackson
 M. Emmet Walsh as  	Sergeant Sanger
 Susan Tyrrell as 	Evie (Wasco's sister, Frank's cousin)
 John Friedrich as 	Squeeze
 Lance LeGault as 	Lieutenant Barnes
 Timothy Carey as 	Bullet
 Deborah White as  	Elaine Schector
 Sandy Ward as 	Warden
 Sydney Lassick as  	Ted
 Helen Page Camp as 	Ted's Wife
 K Callan as Motel Manager

Notes
Both Tim McIntire and M. Emmett Walsh had appeared in the 1980 prison drama Brubaker with Robert Redford.

Production
The idea of the film came from producer & director James B. Harris, who read a book call "The Rap" by Ernest Brawley. Harris wrote the screenplay shortly after reading the book. In June 1980, Lorimar Productions sold the rights to the film & preparation's began. The location crew choose the vacant old Montana State Prison building in Deer Lodge, Montana. In the coming days, officials begin screening extras, & the arts foundation begin to restore the prison building, & to gain community & statewide support to restore the landmark building. Due to heavy rains & volcanic ash fallout due to the eruption of Mount St. Helens on May 18, outside work was delayed, including repairs & painting on the old cell house & the interior. James Woods had signed on to play the prison guard, Frank Miniver, nicknamed Fast-Walking, & was "ecstatic" after he found out the movie was going to be filmed in Montana. Tim McIntire, who plays Fast Walking's cousin-inmate, was young when his parents bought land near Kalispell & owned a ranch in the Yak Valley.

On a budget of $4 million, principal photography began on July 7, 1980, at the prison, while some filming was done in and around the town of Deer Lodge for several weeks. The crew then traveled to the Bus Depot in Butte, Montana to film several scenes for 2 days. Filming was then completed in August.

Release
Fast-Walking was theatrically released in New York City, New York on October 8, 1982, by the Pickman Film Corporation. It was released on VHS and DVD in the United States by Warner Home Video.

See also
Brubaker (1980)
Shawshank Redemption (1994)

References

External links
 
 

1982 films
1982 crime drama films
1980s prison drama films
American crime drama films
American prison drama films
Films about murder
Films about prison escapes
Films based on American novels
Films directed by James B. Harris
Films scored by Lalo Schifrin
Films shot in Montana
1980s English-language films
1980s American films